Leawood  is a city in Johnson County, Kansas, United States, and is part of the Kansas City metropolitan area.  As of the 2020 census, the population of the city was 33,902.

History

19th century 
After the 1803 Louisiana Purchase, the area east of present-day Leawood opened for settlement. The Santa Fe Trail which ran through the area also contributed to the development of the area. The Border Ruffian War (1855-1857), part of a larger conflict known as Bleeding Kansas, damaged the local economy as pro-slavery activists from the slave state of Missouri attacked settlers, traders, and those traveling along the Santa Fe Trail. Conditions improved with the founding of Oxford, Kansas, the predecessor of Leawood. The township was destroyed by the American Civil War, and there was little left by 1865.

Leawood was named for Oscar G. Lee, the original land owner of the town site.

20th century 
Modern Leawood was established in the 1920s, after Oscar G. Lee, a retired police chief from Oklahoma, moved to Johnson County. He supervised the construction of Lee Boulevard for public use.

In 1948, a housing development by the Kroh brothers led to the incorporation as a city. On November 30, 1948, Leawood became a city of the third class with a population of less than 2,000. By 1959, it had become a city of the second class. , it is a city of the first class with approximately 32,800 residents.

, it was one of the Kansas City metropolitan area's wealthiest suburbs, alongside Mission Hills, Kansas, the Country Club Plaza neighborhood, and Olathe, Kansas. Particularly the neighborhoods of Hallbrook, Mission Hill Estates, and Tuscany Reserve were all rated in the top 1%, according to a widely cited research professor.

Geography

The city is bordered on three sides by the cities of Overland Park and Prairie Village, Kansas and on the fourth by Kansas City, Missouri. The city's land area is approximately 75% developed and growth is expected to continue in the future.

Demographics

In an analysis by Bloomberg News, Leawood is cited as the 68th richest city in America by household income. According to a 2007 estimate, the median income for a household in the city was $117,896, and the median income for a family was $136,871. Males had a median income of $90,546 versus $43,933 for females. The per capita income for the city was $49,139. About 0.5% of families and 1.3% of the population were below the poverty line, including 0.5% of those under age 18 and 2.8% of those age 65 or over.

2010 census
As of the census of 2010, there were 31,867 people, 11,781 households, and 9,367 families living in the city. The racial makeup of the city was 92.3% White, 1.9% African American, 0.1% Native American, 3.8% Asian, 0.4% from other races, and 1.4% from two or more races. Hispanic or Latino of any race were 2.2% of the population.

There were 11,781 households, of which 38.0% had children under the age of 18 living with them, 72.7% were married couples living together, 4.8% had a female householder with no husband present, 2.0% had a male householder with no wife present, and 20.5% were non-families. 18.1% of all households were made up of individuals, and 9.6% had someone living alone who was 65 years of age or older. The average household size was 2.70 and the average family size was 3.09.

The median age in the city was 44.7 years. 28.1% of residents were under the age of 18; 4.3% were between the ages of 18 and 24; 18% were from 25 to 44; 34.3% were from 45 to 64; and 15.3% were 65 years of age or older. The gender makeup of the city was 48.5% male and 51.5% female.

The city has become more Democratic in voting since 2016, going from majority conservative to a reliably swing district with near parity in party identification and fundraising. The city is evenly divided 50/50 Democratic-Republican.

2000 census
As of the census of 2000, there were 27,656 people, 9,841 households, and 8,118 families living in the city. The racial makeup of the city was 95.19% White, 1.46% African American, 0.14% Native American, 2.18% Asian, 0.01% Pacific Islander, 0.25% from other races, and 0.77% from two or more races. Hispanic or Latino of any race were 1.30% of the population.

There were 9,841 households, out of which 41.4% had children under the age of 18 living with them, 76.0% were married couples living together, 5.1% had a female householder with no husband present, and 17.5% were non-families. 15.2% of all households were made up of individuals, and 6.5% had someone living alone who was 65 years of age or older. The average household size was 2.81 and the average family size was 3.14.

In the city, the population was spread out, with 30.2% under the age of 18, 4.2% from 18 to 24, 23.2% from 25 to 44, 29.8% from 45 to 64, and 12.6% who were 65 years of age or older. The median age was 41 years. For every 100 females, there were 96.1 males. For every 100 females age 18 and over, there were 93.3 males.

Religion
Leawood is home to the main campus of the United Methodist Church of the Resurrection, which is the largest church in the Kansas City Metropolitan Area and the largest Methodist church in the country with 22,000 members and an average weekly attendance of 13,600.  In 2017, one of the world's largest stained glass works, costing $3.4 million, was established as part of the church's building, depicting stories of Jesus and Martin Luther King Jr.

Leawood is also home to three Catholic parishes: Church of the Nativity, Curé of Ars and St. Michael the Archangel.

Economy

Top employers
According to Leawood's 2017 Comprehensive Annual Financial Report, the top employers in the city were:

Shopping Centers
Town Center Plaza is home to a number of upscale stores with few or no other locations in the Kansas City area.

Government

Law enforcement
The Leawood Police Department is the main department in the city of Leawood, the Johnson County Sheriff's Office also assists as well. The Leawood Police Department was formed on January 18, 1949. The agency was formed when Robert E. Combs became the city's first chief of police. The first officers hired on were unpaid volunteers who wanted to help their community. By 1971 the city had gradually started paying patrol officers, and in 1986 the agency had reached 26 officers, 6 civilians and 1 dispatcher. Now the agency has around 60 officers. Currently the Leawood Police Department enrolls officers in the Johnson County Regional Police Academy who, following their graduation, join the agency, raising the number of officers hired. Leawood Police Officers have a dark navy blue uniform, dark blue pants, as well as black shoes or boots, and a badge with the department's insignia on it along with the Kansas state logo.

The Kansas Highway Patrol rarely patrols the city unless there is a major event. The Leawood police chief is Dale Finger, who has been chief since 2021.

Education

Schools
Two public school districts serve Leawood -- Shawnee Mission School District and Blue Valley USD 229.

Libraries
The Johnson County Library serves the residents of Leawood.

In June 2014, Leawood city officials shut down a Little Free Library due to city ordinance prohibiting free-standing structures in the front yards of residential homes.  The family of the 9-year-old boy who built the structure created a Facebook page to support amendment of Leawood's city code.  Another resident of the city who erected a Little Free Library was threatened with a $25 fine.  There are discussions among the city's residents in working with the city to amend its code regarding free-standing structures in residents' front yards.

Notable people

Notable individuals who were born in and/or have lived in Leawood, include co-founder of Garmin Corporation Min Kao, romance novelist Julie Garwood, U.S. Representative from Missouri Karen McCarthy, baseball pitcher Dan Quisenberry, and founder of Hallmark Cards, Joyce Clyde Hall.

Sister cities 
  Yilan City, Taiwan Province, Republic of China (Taiwan) (1988)
 Gezer Regional Council, Israel (2003)

References

Further reading

External links

 City of Leawood
 Leawood - Directory of Public Officials
 Leawood city map, KDOT

Cities in Kansas
Cities in Johnson County, Kansas
Cities in Kansas City metropolitan area